Keznar (also Romanized as Keznār and Kaznār; also known as Kaznā and Keznā) is a village in Khomeh Rural District, in the Central District of Aligudarz County, Lorestan Province, Iran. At the 2006 census, its population was 371, in 80 families.

References 

Towns and villages in Aligudarz County